Xyris drummondii, common name Drummond's yelloweyed grass, is a North American species of flowering plant in the yellow-eyed-grass family. It is native to the coastal plain of the United States from Georgia to eastern Texas.

Xyris drummondii is a perennial herb up to 25 cm (10 inches) tall with grass-like, olvie-green leaves up to 40 cm (4 inches) long, and yellow flowers.

References

External links

drummondii
Plants described in 1933
Flora of the Southern United States
Flora of Central America
Taxa named by Gustaf Oskar Andersson Malme